Radio Prague International is the official international broadcasting station of the Czech Republic. Broadcasting first began on August 31, 1936 near the spa town of Poděbrady. Radio Prague broadcasts in six languages: English, German, French, Spanish, Czech and Russian. It broadcasts programmes about the Czech Republic on satellite and on the Internet.

In 2021, Rospotrebnadzor blocked the website of Radio Prague International in Russia due to a report about Jan Palach from 2001.

Programming

The station broadcasts a total of 24 hours' worth of programmes per day, 3 hours of which are new programmes (one new 30-minute programme in each of the six languages); the remaining 21 hours are rebroadcasts. Rebroadcast programmes have fresh news bulletins. All programmes last for 30 minutes and have a standard layout: news, current affairs magazine and a feature. The theme of the feature changes each day and each section tailors programmes to suit its audience. The weekend broadcasts have a slightly more relaxed structure, they contain less news and more features devoted to the arts, social affairs, and music.

International cooperation
Radio Prague International produces a number of programmes in co-operation with other radio stations, and also for them. Radio Prague's Czech section produces programmes for Czech expatriates through SBS Radio in Australia, Radio Daruvar in Croatia, Radio Timișoara in Romania and several radio stations in the United States. These programmes are sent by cassette, via the Internet or down telephone lines. The Russian section uses the Internet to send its features to two radio stations in Russia.

From 2001 to 2008, the English section worked with Radio Slovakia International, Radio Budapest and Radio Polonia to produce a programme called Insight Central Europe, which examined contemporary issues facing Central Europe. The programme was discontinued in August 2008. The English Section also participates in a weekly programme called Network Europe co-produced by Deutsche Welle, Radio France International, Radio Netherlands, Radio Polonia, Radio Prague, Radio Romania International, Radio Slovakia International, Radio Sweden and Radio Ukraine International. The English Section also contributes features to Radio Polonia's Europe East programme. Both the English and German sections co-operate with a number of European radio stations on the Radio E project.

The German section works together with Radio Slovakia International to produce a Czech-Slovak magazine programme. The French section contributes towards the Accents d´Europe programme produced by Radio France Internationale. The Spanish section sends programmes to several stations in Latin America.

End of shortwave broadcasts
On December 8, 2010, Radio Prague announced via its Facebook page plans to end shortwave broadcasts on January 31, 2011. Part of the post read: "The station’s financing for next year has been drastically reduced by the Foreign Ministry in line with government austerity measures aimed at cutting the state deficit."

As of May 2015 however, Radio Prague buys an hour of time a day on Radio Miami International to relay its programs via shortwave on 9955 kHz in both English and Spanish, targeting the Caribbean.

In popular culture
 The interval signal, itself the opening bars of the Communist anthem "Kupředu levá" ("Forward Left"), was used as the first track on the album Dazzle Ships by Orchestral Manoeuvres in the Dark. Samples from certain Radio Prague programmes were also included on the tracks "ABC Auto-Industry",  "This is Helena" and "International".
 A song named "Radio Prague" appears on the album Deceit by This Heat.
 The final track of the CD and Download versions of the soundtrack for the Czech-designed video game Machinarium is named "The End (Prague Radio)".

See also 
 Battle for Czech Radio
 Český rozhlas, the Czech publicly funded radio broadcaster
 Česká televize, the Czech publicly funded television broadcaster

References

External links

 Radio Prague Website 
 Radio Prague International stream (all languages)
 Network Europe Magazine 

International broadcasters
Publicly funded broadcasters
Radio stations in the Czech Republic
Radio stations established in 1936
1936 establishments in Czechoslovakia
State media